Foreign Investment may refer to:

Foreign direct investment, of a controlling ownership in a business in one country by an entity based in another country
Foreign Investment and National Security Act of 2007, an Act of the United States Congress
Foreign Investment and NRI Cell, Government of Haryana, in the Haryana State Industrial and Infrastructure Development Corporation (HSIIDC) Panchkula
Foreign Investment Promotion Board, a national agency in India
Foreign Investment Review Agency, ensures that foreign acquisition and establishment of businesses is beneficial to Canada
Foreign Investment Review Board, examines proposals by foreign persons to invest in Australia
Foreign portfolio investment, entry of funds into a country where foreigners deposit money in a country's bank or make purchases in the country's stock and bond markets, sometimes for speculation

See also
Vanuatu Foreign Investment Board